Pallapatti may refer to places in India:

 Pallapatti, Karur, Tamil Nadu
 Pallapatti, Virudhunagar, Tamil Nadu